Paul Joseph Boudier (December 1854 in Corgoloin, Côte-d’Or – 8 November 1908 in Corgoloin) was a French civil servant.

Career 
1885 Sub-prefect of Saint-Quentin in Saint-Quentin City
1888-1893 Prefect of Yonne in Auxerre
1893-1896 Prefect of Haute-Marne in Chaumont
1896-1897 Prefect of Corsica in Ajaccio
1897-1898 Prefect of Saône-et-Loire in Mâcon
1898-1900 Prefect of Haute-Vienne in Limoges

Honours and awards
: Officier of the Légion d’honneur

References
  , Les Préfets du 11 ventôse an VIII au 4 septembre 1870 : répertoires nominatif et territorial, Archives Nationales, 423 pages, 
  Pierre-François Pinaud, Les trésoriers-payeurs généraux au XIXe siècle : répertoires nominatif et territorial, Paris, 1983.
  Christiane Lamoussière, Patrick Laharie,  Le personnel de l'administration préfectorale, 1881-1926, vol. 2, p. 184, éd. Archives nationales, 2001, 

 
 
 
 
 

1854 births
1908 deaths
People from Côte-d'Or
Prefects of France
Prefects of Yonne
Prefects of Haute-Marne
Prefects of Corsica (department)
Prefects of Saône-et-Loire
Prefects of Haute-Vienne
Officiers of the Légion d'honneur
Regents of the Banque de France